Paul Owens is the author of the bestselling dog training book, The Dog Whisperer, Beginning and Intermediate Training for Puppies and Dogs (1999; 2nd edition 2007). His newest puppy training book is The Puppy Whisperer, A Compassionate, Nonviolent Guide to Early Training and Care (2007).

Paul is a leading proponent of positive dog training methods. He is a long-standing member of the Association of Pet Dog Trainers.  He is not associated with Cesar Millan or the National Geographic Channel Dog Whisperer TV series.

References
 Paul Owens, The Original Dog Whisperer
 APDT Recommended Books and DVDs

Dog trainers
Year of birth missing (living people)
Living people